The College Boat Club of the University of Pennsylvania is the rowing program for University of Pennsylvania Rowing, which is located in the Madeira Shell House at #11 Boathouse Row on the historic Boathouse Row of Philadelphia, Pennsylvania. Its membership consists entirely of past and present rowers of the University of Pennsylvania. 

It hosts both heavyweight and lightweight varsity men's teams and an openweight varsity women's team. The Wharton Crew Team, however, rows out of Bachelors Barge Club at #6 Boathouse Row. College Boat Club was founded in 1872 by the school's students, shortly after the school's campus was relocated from Center City to West Philadelphia. College Boat Club was admitted to the Schuylkill Navy in 1875.

History

University Barge Club

The history of rowing at the University of Pennsylvania began in 1854 with the foundation of the University Barge Club.

Founding of College Boat Club
In 1872, University of Pennsylvania ("Penn") students founded the College Barge Club to provide an alternative to the school's first boat club, the University Barge Club, and to focus on preparing students for intercollegiate competitions. The Club later changed its name from College Barge Club to College Boat Club.

In the club's first year, it had only 20 members, mostly sophomores from the university's graduating Class of 1875. At first, the Club rowed out of the Quaker City Barge Club. However, College Boat Club grew quickly and was able to build its own boathouse in 1874.

In 1877, sophomores from College Boat Club were victorious against seniors rowing out of University Barge Club.  By 1879, the club was the base for most Penn crews, and members were rowing in intercollegiate competitions. In 1893, College Boat Club opened membership to alumni as well as enrolled students. In 1904, the Club admitted alumni crews as far back as 1899. Currently, membership for alumni is limited to former varsity rowers.

Competitions
The crews of College Boat Club compete in several regattas throughout the rowing season. The three most competitive regattas are the Eastern Association of Rowing College (EARC) Championship, the Intercollegiate Rowing Association (IRA) Championship, and the Henley Royal Regatta.  As of 1997, the women's crews compete in the NCAA Division I Rowing Championship instead of the IRAs.

EARC Championship (Eastern Sprints)
The Penn heavyweight men's eight has won the Eastern Sprints six times: 1955, 1962 (tied with Yale), 1986, 1991, 1996, and 1998.

The lightweight men's eight has won 5 times: 1951, 1952, 1955, 1976, and 2019.

IRA Championship
Penn, along with Columbia and Cornell, founded the Intercollegiate Rowing Association and competes annually in the Intercollegiate Rowing Association Championship, which is the most competitive race in American collegiate rowing. In 2004, Penn finished fourth in the grand final for the Men's Freshman Four w/Cox and fifth in the Men's Open Four w/Cox grand final.

In 2005, Penn finished third in the Men's Varsity Lightweight Eight and fourth in the Men's Freshman Eight. In 2006, the Men's Freshman Eight finished third. In 2017 and 2019, the Men’s Varsity Lightweight 8 finished 2nd and 3rd, respectively. 

In 2008, the Men's Open Four qualified for the grand final, but finished sixth. The last time that the Penn won the Ivy League Championship at IRAs was 1992, when Penn tied Dartmouth. Penn has won the Ivy League Championship eight additional times in 1898, 1899, 1900, 1967, 1968, 1969, 1972, and 1989.

Henley Royal Regatta
Penn Crew has competed at the prestigious Henley Royal Regatta. In 1994, College Boat Club won the Ladies' Challenge Plate. In 1991, Penn won the Thames Challenge Cup. In 1955, Penn won the most prestigious of all prizes at Henley, the Grand Challenge Cup. Penn also won the Thames Challenge Cup in 1951 and 1952.

National Collegiate Rowing Championship
The men's team won the National Collegiate Rowing Championship in 1991.

1955 crew

The 1955 Men's Heavyweight 8, coached by Joe Burk, won at the Henley Regatta, and the crew's speed drew attention and acclaim internationally. One source highlights the accolades as follows:

Coaching staff
Penn has enjoyed the tutelage of many of the best rowing coaches of all time including Rusty Callow, Joe Burk, Ted Nash, Stan Bergman, Brendan Cunningham, and Hudson Peters.

Ted Nash

In 2004, former Penn coach Ted Nash became the first person to participate in 10 Olympic games as either an athlete or coach when he was appointed  as a coach on the 2004 team in Athens.  This is a record for any member of any US Olympic team, regardless of event or sport.  During his first games at the 1960 Rome Olympics, Nash was on the gold medal-winning four without coxswain boat.  In 2008 he showed no signs of slowing down as made it 11 by returning again to the Olympic stage in Beijing as coach of the heavyweight men's coxless pair.

Stan Bergman

Stan Bergman coached the Men's Heavyweight Rowing Program to numerous championships at all levels. He is held in extraordinary regard in the rowing community, and beyond, for his success with his crews on and off the water.

Women
 Head coach of Women's Crew: Wesley Ng
 Head coach of Women's Crew Emeritus/Quaker Rowing Camp Director: Michael "Touchdown" Lane

Heavyweight men
 Head coach: Albert “Al” Monte
 Assistant coaches: Phil Brunner, Matt Carmody
 Boatman: Andrew Blum
 Boatman Emeritus: Donald “Shep” Shepard

Lightweight men
 Head coach: Colin Farrell
Captain(s): Sam Ward and Zach Howell

Gallery

Prominent members
Ted A. Nash (former Penn Coach) - 1960 (gold medal) & 1964 (bronze medal) US Olympic Teams and US Olympic Coach from 1968 to 2008
Louis Lombardi, Jr., '15 -  2010 US Junior Team, 2014–15 US U23 Teams, 2016 US Senior Team. American actor, songwriter and record producer
John A. Pescatore, '86 - 1988  (bronze medal) & 1992 US Olympic Teams
Hugh Matheson, '84 - 1972, 1976 & 1980 Great Britain Olympic Teams (silver medal)
James E. Moroney III '75 - 1972 & 1976 US Olympic Teams
Luther Vandross, '73 -  American singer, songwriter and record producer
Luther H. Jones, '72 - 1968 & 1972 US Olympic Teams
John Hartigan, '63 - 1968 & 1976 US Olympic Teams
Merrill McPeak, '58 -  American politician and Chief of Staff of the United States Air Force
Harry Parker, '57 - 1960 US Olympic Team and US Olympic Coach 1964-1984
John B. Kelly Jr., '50 - 1948, 1952, 1956 & 1960 US Olympic Teams

Rowers with one Olympic team appearance
These include:

References

Further reading

External links

 College Boat Club on wikimapia.org

Clubhouses on the National Register of Historic Places in Philadelphia
National Historic Landmarks in Pennsylvania
Buildings and structures in Philadelphia
Cultural infrastructure completed in 1874
Gothic Revival architecture in Pennsylvania
Boathouse Row
Schuylkill Navy
Sports clubs established in 1872
1872 establishments in Pennsylvania
Philadelphia Register of Historic Places
Historic district contributing properties in Pennsylvania
Eastern Association of Rowing Colleges
Boathouses on the National Register of Historic Places in Pennsylvania